"Pegao" (From syncope of "pegado"; English: "stuck, glued") is the first single by Wisin & Yandel from the album Los Vaqueros. Listeners interpret the song as expressing a desire to dance extremely close. "Ella lo baila pegao, pegao, pegao (she likes to dance mad close, close, close)".

Remixes
There have been a number of remixes, one featuring Zodiac and the other can be found in the album Los Vaqueros Wild Wild Mixes which features Reggae artist Elephant Man. And another one with the former WY Record member El Tio.

Chart positions

References

2006 singles
Wisin & Yandel songs
Song recordings produced by Luny Tunes
Machete Music singles